Haloarcula hispanica pleomorphic virus 1 (HHPV1) is a double stranded DNA virus that infects the halophilic archaeon Haloarcula hispanica. It has a number of unique features unlike any previously described virus.

Virology
The virions are enveloped and pleomorphic is shape. The envelope contains a variety of lipids including cardiolipins, phosphatidylglycerols, phosphatidylglycerophosphate methyl esters and phosphatidylglycerosulfates. There are two major proteins in the envelope — VP3 (12 kiloDaltons in weight) and VP4 (60 kiloDaltons in weight).

The virions exit the host without lysis suggesting a budding mechanism.

Genome
The genome is a single molecule of double stranded DNA, circular, 8082 base pairs in length with a G+C content of 55.8%. It has eight open reading frames (ORFs). VP3 and VP4 are encoded by ORF3 and ORF4 respectively.

ORF1 is probably a replication initiation protein. ORF3 encodes an  integral membrane protein with a 50 amino acid signal sequence and two transmembrane regions. Before the C-terminal transmembrane domain is a coiled-coil region. ORF7 contains a NTPase domain but its function is not clear.

Taxonomy
Examination of the proteins and genome organisation of this virus suggests that it related to the single stranded DNA virus Halorubrum pleomorphic virus 1, the plasmid pHK2 and a region within the archeon Haloferax volcanii. It seems likely that the plasmid pHK2 may be a virus that can form circular plasmids and that the region within Haloferax volcanii is a prophage.

The similarity between these double stranded DNA elements and the single stranded virus Halorubrum pleomorphic virus 1 is currently unique. If this relationship can be confirmed for other viruses it suggests that the currently used Baltimore system of classification may be in need of revision.

References

Double-stranded DNA viruses
Archaeal viruses